Blue perch can refer to several species of fish:

 Blue badis (Badis badis), a chameleonfish from freshwater of Asia
 Cunner (Tautogolabrus adspersus), a wrasse from the northwestern Atlantic Ocean
 Halfmoon (Medialuna californiensis), a sea chub from the northeastern Pacific Ocean